Edward Oliver Le Blanc (October 3, 1923 – October 29, 2004) was a Dominican politician. He served as the chief minister of Dominica from January 1961 to March 1, 1967 and as the first premier of Dominica.

Life and career
Le Blanc was born in Vieille Case. He joined the Dominica Labour Party in 1957. He joined the government of the Federation of the West Indies in Trinidad in 1958, but returned to Dominica later to become the leader of his party. He won a seat in the House of Assembly in 1961.

Le Blanc served as chief minister of Dominica from January 1961 to March 1, 1967. In March 1967, when the British granted Dominica more self-government, Le Blanc became premier.

Le Blanc tried to implement socialist policies in Dominica. He was committed to helping poor workers, whom he called "little men", a catchphrase which still remains in Dominican politics. He was very popular with the voters, winning three elections in three different constituencies, and is believed by many to be one of the founders of the Dominican nation. He unexpectedly resigned on July 27, 1974, and retired from politics and public life. He did not explain his retirement and refused to give interviews, but it is believed that he was tired of the opposition to his policies by many in the government. He returned to Vieille Case, where he died.

References

1923 births
2004 deaths
People from Saint Andrew Parish, Dominica
Finance ministers of Dominica
Dominica Labour Party politicians
Members of the Federal Parliament of the West Indies Federation